Marj al-Qata is a village in northern Syria located northwest of Homs in the Homs Governorate. According to the Syria Central Bureau of Statistics, Marj al-Qata had a population of 893 in the 2004 census. Its inhabitants are predominantly Turkmen.

References

Bibliography

 

Populated places in Homs District
Turkmen communities in Syria